Kazimierz Wardak (4 March 1947 in Połczyn-Zdrój – 25 October 2020) was a Polish runner who specialized in the 800 metres.

Career
At the 1970 European Indoor Championships he won a silver medal in medley relay together with Edmund Borowski, Stanisław Waśkiewicz, and Eryk Żelazny.

At the 1971 European Indoor Championships he won a silver medal in 4 x 800 metres relay together with Krzysztof Linkowski, Zenon Szordykowski, and Michał Skowronek. This team still holds the Polish indoor record in the event.

Wardak died on 25 October 2020, aged 73.

References

1947 births
2020 deaths
Polish male middle-distance runners
People from Połczyn-Zdrój
Sportspeople from West Pomeranian Voivodeship
Zawisza Bydgoszcz athletes